Paul Assaiante is currently the Men’s Squash and Tennis coach at Trinity College in Hartford, Connecticut, Ganek Family US Squash Head National Coach, Professional Speaker and Author. Two-time Olympic Coach-of-the-Year, World Championship Coach and the “winningest coach in college sports history”, Paul Assaiante has motivated top athletes from around the world. His core belief is the need to embrace our fears in order to remove the obstacles to our success.  He captures this concept in his book, Run to the Roar: Coaching to Overcome Fear, a visionary reflection on leadership and mentoring from one of America’s most successful coaches.

Assaiante is a 1974 graduate of Springfield College and holds a master's degree from Long Island University , he currently resides in West Hartford, Connecticut.

Assaiante has led the Trinity men's squash team to seventeen national titles. From 1998-2012, Assaiante and Trinity won 252 consecutive matches, including thirteen national championships—the longest winning streak in college sports history. The steak came to an end when Yale defeated Trinity, 5-4, on January 18, 2012.

In 2014, a $2 million gift to US Squash established the Ganek Family US Squash Head National Coach Fund and Assaiante became the inaugural Ganek Family US Squash Head National Coach on a formal part-time basis. The position is currently the only known endowed coaching position among the more than four dozen sports that are members of the United States Olympic Committee.

At the 2016 Delaware Investments U.S. Open Squash Championships, Assaiante was inducted into the U.S. Squash Hall of Fame.

Professional career

Hartford, CT 
 1985–present: Public Speaker with over 150 presentations with topics ranging from team building to the psychology of success, fear management and the 'awesome power of now’.

 2000-2007: Head Coach of the Hartford FoxForce, a member of World Team Tennis.

Trinity College, Hartford, CT 
  1994–present: Director of Racquet Sports
 1995–present: Associate Professor of Physical Education
 2000–present: Director of Athletic Development and College Relations
 2000-2005: Director of Physical Education

US Squash
 2014–present: Ganek Family US Squash Head National Coach

Princeton Club of New York, New York, NY
 1991-1994: Squash Professional

The Baltimore Country Club, Baltimore, MD
 1989-1991: Director of Racquet Sports

Williams College, Williamstown, MA
 1987-1989: Director of Racquet Sports, Assistant Professor

The Apawamis Club, Rye, NY
 1985-1987: Director of Racquet Sports

United States Military Academy of West Point, NY
 1974-1985: Professor and Coach

Awards and Accomplishment 
1998-2012: Longest consecutive winning streak of any college sport.
 Coaching Career Record: 1,024-140
 Squash Record at Trinity College: 468-21
Coached 75 All Americans and numerous National Champions in both tennis and squash.

2016: Inducted into U.S. Squash Hall of Fame

2014: Named Ganek Family US Squash Head National Coach

2010: Named U.S. National Squash Coach.

2010: Assaiante Tennis Center Dedication, Trinity College.

2009: Elected to Springfield College Hall of Fame.

2003: U.S.Squash Racquets Association Presidents Award for his lifelong contribution to the sport.

2002: Arthur Hughes Award Recipient (Junior Professor of the Year),Trinity College.

2000:Hartford Courant Coach of the Century.

 Multiple NESCAC Coach of the Year Awards: Tennis and Squash.
 Two- Time Olympic Coach of the Year.
 Hartford World Team Tennis Coach.
 U.S.A. World Team Squash Coach.
 U.S. National Squash Coach
 Recipient of the Gold Key Award from the Connecticut sports writers guild. 
 Has raised three million dollars to endow his own Chair "Paul D. Assaiante Professorship of Physical Education".
 Has raised two million dollars to endow the U.S. National Squash Coach Chair "The Ganek Family Chair".

Publications
Run to the Roar: Coaching to Overcome Fear with James Zug (Penguin Books, 2010) 
Championship Tennis by the Experts: How to Play Championship Tennis, with Vic Braden (Leisure Press, June 1979)

References

External links
 http://athletics.trincoll.edu/sports/msquash/coaches/ASSAIANTE_PAUL
 http://goodmanspeakersbureau.com/keynote_speaker/assaiante_paul
 https://www.amazon.com/Run-Roar-Coaching-Overcome-Fear/dp/1591844711

Living people
American male squash players
Trinity Bantams men's tennis coaches
Squash coaches
Springfield College (Massachusetts) alumni
Long Island University alumni
Year of birth missing (living people)